Lieutenant General Sir Arthur Edward Grasett  (20 October 1888 – 4 December 1971) was a British-Canadian soldier who served with the British Army in Canada, England, India and China.

Education

Grasett was born in 1888 in Plymouth, the eldest son of Arthur Wanton Grasell of Toronto, Ontario and Catharine Frances Hewett of Halifax, Nova Scotia, daughter of Army officer Edward Osborne Hewett. He was educated at Upper Canada College in Toronto. He enrolled at the Royal Military College of Canada in Kingston, Ontario in 1906.

Military service
Grasett was commissioned into the Royal Engineers on 24th of June 1909.

He served with distinction during World War I, earning the Military Cross (MC) in 1915, the Distinguished Service Order (DSO) in 1918, and five times mentioned in despatches. He then attended the Staff College, Camberley from 1920 to 1921. He served on operations on the North West Frontier of India from 1921 and then as a General Staff Officer at the Staff College from 1935. As a Brigadier, he served on the General Staff in the headquarters of Northern Command from 1937 and was appointed Commander of British Troops in China in 1938.

Grasett served in World War II as General Officer Commanding (GOC) of the 48th (South Midland) Division from 1941 and, promoted to acting lieutenant general on 7 November 1941, was made GOC of VIII Corps on the South Coast of England from November 1941. In 1944 he was posted to the War Office and served as Chief of the European Allied Contact Section of the SHAEF under General Dwight D. Eisenhower from 1944 to 1945. He was appointed Lieutenant Governor of Jersey and Colonel Commandant Royal Engineers in 1945 and retired in 1947.

Awards and recognition 
 Knight Commander of the Order of the British Empire (1945)
 CB (16 July 1940)
 MC (17 January 1916)
 DSO (5 June 1919)
 Grand Cross of the Order of the Crown (15 August 1946)
 Order of the Red Banner (21 June 1945)
 Chief Commander Legion Legion of Merit (8 November 1945)
 1914 Star
 Clasp
 British War Medal
 Victory Medal
 India General Service Medal
 Clasp Waziristan 1921–24
 He was also MID five times.
 19 October 1914
 1 January 1916
 4 January 1917
 11 December 1917
 5 July 1919

Family
In 1935, he married Joan Mary, who was the daughter of JK Foster of Egton Manor, Yorkshire.

References

Sources
4237 Dr. Adrian Preston & Peter Dennis (Edited) "Swords and Covenants" Rowman And Littlefield, London. Croom Helm. 1976.
H16511 Dr. Richard Arthur Preston "To Serve Canada: A History of the Royal Military College of Canada" 1997 Toronto, University of Toronto Press, 1969.
H16511 Dr. Richard Arthur Preston "Canada's RMC - A History of Royal Military College" Second Edition 1982
H1877 R. Guy C. Smith (editor) "As You Were! Ex-Cadets Remember". In 2 Volumes. Volume I: 1876–1918. Volume II: 1919–1984. Royal Military College. [Kingston]. The R.M.C. Club of Canada. 1984

External links
Biography of Lieutenant General Sir Arthur Edward GRASETT
British Army Officers 1939–1945
Generals of World War II

|-

|-

|-

1888 births
1971 deaths
Canadian Anglicans
Canadian generals
British Army generals of World War II
Knights Commander of the Order of the British Empire
Companions of the Order of the Bath
Companions of the Distinguished Service Order
Recipients of the Military Cross
Chief Commanders of the Legion of Merit
Royal Military College of Canada alumni
Upper Canada College alumni
Governors of Jersey
Recipients of the Order of the Red Banner
Graduates of the Staff College, Camberley
Graduates of the Royal College of Defence Studies
Royal Engineers officers
British Army personnel of World War I
British Army lieutenant generals
Academics of the Staff College, Camberley
Burials in Ontario
British emigrants to Canada